Phil Kaufman may refer to:

Philip Kaufman (born 1936), American film director and screenwriter
Philip A. Kaufman (1942–1992), American engineer
Phil Kaufman Award,  electronic design automation award
Phil Kaufman (producer) (born 1935), American music producer and manager